Bailey's Store is one of the last nineteenth century commercial structures on Edisto Island, Charleston County, South Carolina. Bailey's Store was likely built earlier than 1825 on Edingsville Beach, a popular seaside resort, before it was moved to its present location about 1870 following the abandonment of Edingsville Beach. Because all of the remaining structures at Edingsville Beach were swept into the Atlantic Ocean in the hurricane of 1893, Bailey's Store is the only survivor of that community. The building was moved in two parts to Store Creek. It was reassembled there for use as a gin house already on that location. The building was listed in the National Register November 28, 1986.

Bailey's Store is a two-story building with weatherboard cladding and side gables. When Highway 174 was moved in about 1940, Bailey's Store was turned 180 degrees. The Edisto Island Post Office was located at Bailey's Store for many years in an addition on the south side. The addition has since been removed. A hipped roof runs above the front door from the western elevation. The three windows on the first floor and five on the second are asymmetrically placed. There is a one-story, hipped roof addition on the back of the building. Additionally, the interior of the house was substantially renovated in the 1980s.

References

Commercial buildings on the National Register of Historic Places in South Carolina
National Register of Historic Places in Charleston County, South Carolina
Buildings and structures in Charleston County, South Carolina